Jibbain     is a municipality in Southern Lebanon, located in Tyre District, Governorate of South Lebanon.

Name
According to E. H. Palmer, the name means "the two pits".

History
In 1596, it was named as a village,  Jibin, in the Ottoman nahiya (subdistrict) of  Tibnin  under the liwa' (district) of Safad, with a population of  7  households, all Muslim. The villagers paid a  fixed tax-rate of 25% on  agricultural products, such as wheat, barley,  olive trees,  goats, beehives; in addition to occasional revenues and a press for olive oil or grape syrup; a total of 2,177  akçe.

In 1875, Victor Guérin noted here "a few   Metawileh families", who inhabited an ancient locality.

In 1881, the PEF's Survey of Western Palestine (SWP) described it:  "A small village, built of stone, containing about seventy Metawileh; it is situated on a hill, with figs, olives, and arable land around. There are three cisterns for water." They further noted a ruined, rock-cut birket.

Modern era
On  August 3 or 4, 2006, during the 2006 Lebanon War, Israeli helicopter strikes killed 4 Hezbollah operatives in an uninhabited valley some 900 meters  from Jibbain. At the same time, they fired on the house nearest, killing 4 civilians, aged 42 to 81 years of age.

References

Bibliography

External links
Jibbain, Localiban
Survey of Western Palestine, Map 3:  IAA, Wikimedia commons

Populated places in Tyre District
Shia Muslim communities in Lebanon